Barasat Indira Gandhi Memorial High School is an English Medium Co-Educational School at Jessore Road, Barasat. It was founded by Shri Shyam Deo Rai. It was inaugurated in late 25 December 1989 at 12.00.00 AM (Indian Standard Time). The current principal of the school is Mrs Sunanda Jaiswal and the vice principal is Purnima Singh. It is affiliated to the Central Board of Secondary Education, New Delhi.

Location 
The school is located on the busy Jessore Road. It has an area of about 1.08 acre. Opposite the school, there is Renuka Eye Hospital and Kidzee (Barasat Branch).

Infrastructure 
On the outside, there are two buildings. The left building is of Primary classes (UN to Class 5) and the right one is of Secondary Classes (Classes 6 to 12). The school has almost all the facilities like Library, Chemistry Lab, Physics Lab, Biology Lab, Computer Lab, Gym Room, Indoor Games Room. The classes are equipped with HCL Technologies' Smart Class Kit.

School campus 
The outer area covered by the school is much little. There is a small playground which only the primary students—of classes UN to 5—has access to. The secondary students have access only to a concrete ground.

See also
Education in India
List of schools in India
Education in West Bengal

References

External links 
 

High schools and secondary schools in Kolkata
Schools in North 24 Parganas district
1989 establishments in West Bengal
Educational institutions established in 1989